Gerald Orlando Sveen (December 7, 1924 – September 23, 2021) was an American politician in the state of North Dakota. He was a member of the North Dakota House of Representatives from 1993 to 2000. An alumnus of Temple University and the University of North Dakota, he worked as a dentist. He was also a mayor of Bottineau, North Dakota and a World War II and Korean War veteran. Sveen died in September 2021, at the age of 96.

References

1924 births
2021 deaths
American military personnel of the Korean War
American military personnel of World War II
Republican Party members of the North Dakota House of Representatives
Temple University alumni
University of North Dakota alumni
People from Bottineau County, North Dakota